Bruno Vieira de Souza (born 12 August 1997), commonly known as Bruninho, is a Brazilian footballer who plays as a midfielder.

Career
Bruninho began his career in the Sobradinho Esporte Clube from Brazilian Federal District. In September 2016 he transferred to Ukraine and in January 2017 Bruninho signed a contract with the Ukrainian Premier League FC Zirka. In January 2018 he left Ukrainian club.

On 29 March 2018, Bruninho signed 2,5 years contract with Lithuanian club Atlantas Klaipėda.

On 20 August 2018, he returned to Ukraine and signed for First League club Volyn Lutsk.

References

External links

1997 births
Living people
Brazilian footballers
Association football midfielders
Sobradinho Esporte Clube players
Brazilian expatriate footballers
Expatriate footballers in Ukraine
FC Zirka Kropyvnytskyi players
Ukrainian Premier League players
Brazilian expatriate sportspeople in Ukraine
FC Volyn Lutsk players